Second Chances (International title: Another Chance) is a 2015 Philippine television drama romance series broadcast by GMA Network. Directed by Laurice Guillen, it stars Raymart Santiago, Camille Prats, Rafael Rosell and Jennylyn Mercado. It premiered on January 12, 2015 on the network's Telebabad line up replacing Hiram na Alaala. The series concluded on May 8, 2015 with a total of 83 episodes. It was replaced by The Rich Man's Daughter in its timeslot.

The series is streaming online on YouTube.

Premise
The story revolves around Lyra, Bernard, Rebecca and Jerome. When Lyra meets Bernard who both lost their spouse, their lives start to intertwine with each other along with Jerome and Rebecca who suffers from bipolar disorder.

Cast and characters

Lead cast
 Raymart Santiago as Bernard Castello 
 Camille Prats as Rebecca "Reb / Becky" Villacorta 
 Rafael Rosell as Jerome Padilla / Michael 
 Jennylyn Mercado as Lyra Bermudez-Padilla

Supporting cast
 Chynna Ortaleza as Colleen Paredes
 Roi Vinzon as Federico Villacorta
 Miriam Quiambao as Alyssa
 Frencheska Farr as Penelope "Penny" Ampil
 Gerard Pizarras as Jonas Rodrigo
 Miggs Cuaderno as Benjie
 Joshen Bernardo as Billy Castello / Daryl Villacorta
 Ayen Munji-Laurel as Norma Padilla
 Glenda Garcia as Carmen Bermudez
 Ricky Davao as Benito Bermudez

Guest cast
 Luis Alandy as Albert Bermudez
 Joshua Uy as Marky Bermudez
 Ryza Cenon as Mariel
 Jackie Rice as Denise Paredes-Castello
 Diva Montelaba as Sam
 Frances Makil-Ignacio as Consuelo Timeo
 Jaime Fabregas as an attorney
 Mel Kimura
 Kier Legaspi as Larry
 Nina Ricci Alagao as Chona
 Marc Abaya as Dustin
 Arianne Bautista as April Villacorta

Ratings
According to AGB Nielsen Philippines' Mega Manila household television ratings, the pilot episode of Second Chances earned an 18.6% rating. While the final episode scored an 18% rating.

References

External links
 
 

2015 Philippine television series debuts
2015 Philippine television series endings
Filipino-language television shows
GMA Network drama series
Philippine romance television series
Television shows set in Quezon City